Curtis Thomas Enis (born June 15, 1976) is a former American college and professional football player who was a running back in the National Football League (NFL) for three seasons.  He played college football for Penn State University, and earned All-American honors.  Enis was a first-round pick in the 1998 NFL Draft, and played professionally for the NFL's Chicago Bears and Cleveland Browns.  He was also a key player in Midway’s 1998 NFL Blitz, often regarded as the best player in the game, rarely fumbling when using the spin move.

Early years
Enis was born in Union City, Ohio.  He attended Mississinawa Valley High School in Union City, where he was named a Parade magazine high school All-American, and voted Ohio's Mr. Football Award by the Associated Press.  He was a three-time all-state selection at linebacker, and Most Valuable Player of the 1994 Big 33 Football Classic.  He spent one year at The Kiski School in Saltsburg, Pennsylvania.

College career
Enis attended Pennsylvania State University, where he majored in recreational management and played for coach Joe Paterno's Penn State Nittany Lions football team from 1995 to 1997. Following his junior season in 1997, he was recognized as a consensus first-team All-American.

His rushing stats at Penn State were:

 1995–113 attempts, 683 yards, 4 Touchdowns
 1996-224 Attempts, 1,210 yards, 13 Touchdowns
 1997-228 attempts, 1,363 yards, 19 Touchdowns

Professional career

Enis initially held out and ended up missing 26 days of training camp and 2 exhibition games after being drafted by the Chicago Bears with the 5th overall pick.

Enis made just one start before tearing a ligament in his left knee in November 1998. His career in Chicago was largely defined by struggling to stay on the field as a result of injuries, and by poor production when he did play. By 2000, Enis had been supplanted by James Allen and was being utilized as a FB. In three years, he played 36 games, accumulating 1,497 rushing yards and 4 touchdowns.

In 2001, at the age of 24, Enis signed a one-year deal with the Cleveland Browns, but a degenerative condition in his left knee forced him into retirement.

Post-playing career
After retiring, Enis was hired by ABInBev as an Operation Manager.

Enis was the  head football coach at Bradford High School in Bradford, Ohio from 2010 to 2013. Enis was the Ohio High School Athletic Association (OHSAA) Division VI Coach of the Year in 2010.
 He resigned from that position in August 2014.

References

External links

 Curtis Enis article at www.bearshistory.com

1976 births
Living people
All-American college football players
American football running backs
Chicago Bears players
Penn State Nittany Lions football players
People from Union City, Ohio
Players of American football from Ohio
The Kiski School alumni